Home Suite Home is an album by Patrick Williams, released by BFM Jazz / Varèse Sarabande on October 2, 2015. It earned Williams a Grammy Award nomination for Best Large Jazz Ensemble Album.

Track list

Personnel

Patti Austin - vocals
Wayne Bergeron - trumpet
Chuck Berghofer - bass
Eric Boulanger - mastering
Dave Crusin - piano
Jeff Driskill - alto sax
Peter Erskine - drums
Daniel Fornero - trumpet
Steve Genewick - engineer
Craig Gosnell - bass trombone
Dan Grecco - percussion
Dan Higgins - alto sax
Dusting Higgins - engineer
Jason Lee - engineer, producer
Charlie Loper - trombone
Andrew Martin - trombone
Bob McChesney - trombone
Dean Parks - guitar
Al Schmitt - engineer, mixing
Tom Scott - tenor sax
Bob Sheppard - tenor sax
Frank Sinatra Jr. - vocals
Joe Soldo - orchestra manager
Michael Stever - trumpet
Bob Summers - trumpet
Tierney Sutton - vocals
Patrick Williams - conductor, producer

References

2015 albums
Jazz albums by American artists
Varèse Sarabande albums